Tennessee is an unincorporated community in Marion Township, Drew County, Arkansas, United States. Tennessee is located on U.S. Route 278 west of Monticello.

References

Unincorporated communities in Drew County, Arkansas
Unincorporated communities in Arkansas
Arkansas placenames of Native American origin